Choristoneura parallela, the parallel-banded leafroller moth, is a species of moth of the family Tortricidae. It is found in North America, where it has been recorded from California, Florida, Georgia, Indiana, Kentucky, Maine, Maryland, Michigan, Mississippi, New Jersey, North Carolina, Ohio, Oklahoma, Quebec, Saskatchewan, South Carolina, Tennessee, Virginia and West Virginia.

The wingspan is 21–23 mm. Adults have been recorded on wing from March to October.

The larvae feed on Solidago, Kalmia, Vaccinium, Phaseolus, Myrica, Rosa, Gardenia, Citrus, Sarracenia and Smilax species, as well as Gerbera jamesonii, Hypericum perforatum, Chamaedaphne calyculata and Salix humilis var. tristis.

References

Moths described in 1869
Choristoneura